Vizeadmiral Lothar von Arnauld de la Perière (18 March 1886 – 24 February 1941), born in Posen, Prussia, and of French-German descent, was a German U-boat commander during World War I. With 194 ships and  sunk, he is the most successful submarine captain ever. His victories came in the Mediterranean, almost always using his 8.8-cm deck gun. During his career he fired 74 torpedoes, hitting 39 times.

Arnauld de la Perière remained in the German Navy (Reichsmarine) after the war ended. During World War II, he was recalled to active duty as a rear admiral, and was killed in a plane crash near Paris in 1941 while taking part in secret negotiations with the Vichy French government.

First World War

Arnauld de la Perière entered the Kaiserliche Marine in 1903.

At the outbreak of the First World War, Arnauld de la Perière served as an adjutant to admiral Hugo von Pohl in Berlin. Upon the mobilization, he was transferred to an active post where he served in the Marine-Luftschiff-Abteilung. In 1915, Arnauld de la Perière transferred to the U-boats. One of his victories was the French troop carrier , which sank with great loss of life. His record number of sunken tonnage and number of sunken ships is unsurpassed since then. For his service, he was awarded the Iron Cross, second and first class, and the Pour le Mérite in 1916.

Interbellum
After the end of the war, Arnauld de la Perière stayed in a vastly reduced German Navy. From  24 September 1928 to 10 October 1930, he commanded the light cruiser . Promoted to captain in 1931, he was put on the retired list. He then taught at the Turkish Naval Academy from 1932 to 1938.

Second World War

At the start of World War II, Arnauld de la Perière was again called up for active duty. Until March 1940, he served as naval commandant in Danzig until he was sent to the Low Countries as naval commandant for Belgium and the Netherlands. Promoted to Konteradmiral Arnauld de la Perière was made naval commandant in Brittany and later for the entire western French seacoast. He was promoted to Vizeadmiral on 1 February 1941. Transferred to take up command of Navy Group South, he was killed when his plane crashed on takeoff near Le Bourget Airport. He is buried in Berlin at the Invalidenfriedhof.

Awards
 Pour le Mérite (11 October 1916)
 Iron Cross (1914), 1st and 2nd classes
 Knight's Cross of the Royal House Order of Hohenzollern with swords
 Order of the Crown, 4th class
 U-boat War Badge (1918)
 Service Award Cross
 Hanseatic Cross Hamburg
 Knight's Cross of the Imperial Austrian Order of Leopold with war decoration
 Order of the Iron Crown, 3rd class with War Decoration (Austria-Hungary)
 Military Merit Cross, 3rd class with War Decoration (Austria-Hungary)
 Silver Liakat Medal with swords
 Gallipoli Star (Ottoman Empire)

Notes

External links
 The U-Boat ACE of ACES by William H. Langenberg, Sea Classics, May 2004 on findarticles.com
 Raiders of the Deep, by Lowell Thomas (Doubleday, Doran & Co., Garden City, NY, 1929).
 Lothar von Arnauld de la Perière. Erfolgreichster U-Bootkommandant der Seekriegsgeschichte – ein vergessener „Kriegsheld“?, by Clemens Bogedain (Franz Steiner Verlag, Stuttgart, 2016) (ger).
 Arnauld de la Perière, sous-marinier du Kaiser on www.histomar.net (fr)

This depicts the finishing off of ships whose crews have been allowed to abandon them, in accordance with rules that Germany followed early in the war. The dynamiting team, deck gun, and one torpedo attack are shown. In six parts, silent with German caption slides.

1886 births
1941 deaths
German people of French descent
Military personnel from Poznań
U-boat commanders (Imperial German Navy)
Vice admirals of the Kriegsmarine
People from the Province of Posen
Victims of aviation accidents or incidents in France
Recipients of the Pour le Mérite (military class)
Recipients of the Silver Liakat Medal
Burials at the Invalids' Cemetery
20th-century Freikorps personnel
Imperial German Navy personnel of World War I